The New Look was the name given to the national security policy of the United States during the administration of President Dwight D. Eisenhower. It reflected Eisenhower's concern for balancing the Cold War military commitments of the United States with the nation's financial resources. The policy emphasised reliance on strategic nuclear weapons as well as a reorganisation of conventional forces in an effort to deter potential threats, both conventional and nuclear, from the Eastern Bloc of nations headed by the Soviet Union.

History

In its narrowest sense, the New Look was the name applied to the Department of Defense budget for Fiscal Year 1955, which was the first defense budget prepared entirely by Eisenhower's own Joint Chiefs of Staff. It was based on an extensive reappraisal of U.S. military requirements that began among Eisenhower and his closest advisers immediately following his election in November 1952. It was formalized in National Security Council document 162/2 (NSC 162/2), which Eisenhower approved on October 30, 1953.

Increased reliance on tactical nuclear weapons
Eisenhower said of tactical nuclear weapons that "on strictly military targets and for strictly military purposes, I see no reason why they shouldn't be used just exactly as you would use a bullet or anything else". NSC 162/2 reflected Eisenhower's desire for a "long-haul" approach to security planning that would maintain a more or less constant level of military preparedness, consistent with the health of the U.S. economy. In this respect, it differed from NSC 68, approved by President Harry S. Truman on September 30, 1950. Truman's advisers believed that Soviet military capabilities would reach a maximum relative to those of the United States and its allies in the mid-1950s.

Eisenhower rejected the idea that one period would be any more dangerous than another and urged his planners to think in terms of a Soviet threat that was economic as well as military.  He wanted to avoid, in his own words, "an unbearable security burden leading to economic disaster." With the costly experience of the Korean War in mind, Eisenhower was fearful that U.S. resources would be drained by Soviet-inspired regional conflicts.

Covert operations
The New Look Policy also embodied an increasing reliance on the use of covert operations and espionage. This was not only due to the fact that clandestine forces were cheap when compared to conventional forces, but also because covert techniques were legitimised in the context of the Cold War.

The Special Atomic Demolition Munition (SADM) program, relying on small, portable nuclear weapons, also was consistent with the New Look policy. Green Light Teams, U.S. commandos trained in secret exercises in which they carried actual nuclear weapons, were set up.
Their missions would have been to infiltrate targets carrying nuclear weapons, to detonate and to be exfiltrated, although the commandos often understood that they were to be sent on kamikaze missions.

U.S. government propaganda
Psychological warfare was a nonviolent technique of combatting the Soviets that especially appealed to Eisenhower, with the goal of flooding communist states with anti-Soviet propaganda.

Massive Retaliation and the New Look

In order to contain defense costs, the New Look brought about a shift in emphasis from conventional military capability to "air-atomic" capability in the form of the Strategic Air Command within a scaled-down overall military establishment.  Land and naval forces were cut.  Continental air defense was expanded.  Although strategic air power attained a lower level than the Truman administration had projected, it became the centerpiece of U.S. security thinking, embodied in the doctrine of "Massive Retaliation."  Summarized in the popular slogan "more bang for the buck," Massive Retaliation was intended to be both a deterrent to an enemy and an economy of scale if deterrence failed.

The doctrine was proclaimed in its most absolute form by Secretary of State John Foster Dulles in a speech before the Council on Foreign Relations on January 12, 1954, in which he said, "Local defenses must be reinforced by the further deterrent of massive retaliatory power [emphasis added]. Dulles continued:

<blockquote>
The way to deter aggression is for the free community to be willing and able to respond vigorously at places and with means of its own choosing.

 ...Now the Department of Defense and the Joint Chiefs of Staff can shape our military establishment to fit what is our policy, instead of having to try to be ready to meet the enemy's many choices.  That permits of a selection of military means instead of a multiplication of means,  As a result, it is now possible to get, and share, more basic security at less cost.</blockquote>

Criticism of Massive Retaliation
What Dulles implied was that the United States was prepared to respond to a Soviet-backed conventional threat anywhere with a nuclear strike against the Soviet Union itself. Critics of Massive Retaliation such as historian John Lewis Gaddis have pointed out that the doctrine was not credible in the face of "less-than-total challenges" such as the Soviet intervention in the 1956 Hungarian Revolution, and that whatever credibility it might have had diminished steadily as Soviet strategic power grew. Furthermore, it theoretically provided the Soviet Union with an incentive to strike first to disarm the United States. The Hungarian Revolution involved a matter internal to the Eastern Bloc, so it is unclear whether any sort of conventional military response would have been undertaken regardless.

"New" New Look

The refusal of the United States to act to prevent the defeat of France by the communist-led Viet Minh at the Battle of Dien Bien Phu, just four months after the Dulles speech, highlighted the political difficulties Eisenhower faced in balancing interference in Asia with his determination to keep the U.S. out of a "hot war". His refusal to intervene using air strikes – a tactic that he decided would have been ineffective in the scenario of Dien Bien Phu – led instead to a third option: a threat of nuclear strikes against strategic Chinese targets, in line with "Massive Retaliation". This was approved on May 26, on the condition that both congress and U.S. allies supported it. 

This tactic could not be relied upon to secure US interests in every case however. Defense planners, therefore, began shaping a "new" New Look marked by emphasis on strategic "sufficiency," not superiority; on tactical nuclear weapons to fight "limited wars;" and on standing forces as opposed to reserves. The emphasis was still primarily on nuclear weapons and the justification was still that of economy, but a shift toward what would later be called "flexible response" had begun.

The new approach was embodied in NSC5440 (approved as NSC5501 on January 7, 1955), finalized in December 1954, which stated:

According to historian Campbell Craig:

Notes

Further reading
Bowie, Robert R.  and Richard H. Immerman, Waging Peace: How Eisenhower Shaped an Enduring Cold War Strategy Oxford, New York: Oxford University Press, 1997. 
 Dockrill, Saki. Eisenhower’s New-Look National Security Policy, 1953-61 New York (1996).
 
Hammond, Paul Y. Organizing for Defense, Princeton, NJ: Princeton University Press, 1961.
Head, Richard G.  and Ervin J. Rokke (eds.), American Defense Policy (3rd ed.), Baltimore: Johns Hopkins University Press 1975. 
Kintner,  William R. Peace and the Strategy Conflict,  New York: Frederick A. Praeger, 1967.
Millis, Walter ed. American Military Thought, Indianapolis: Bobbs-Merrill Co., 1966.

Osgood, Robert E.  Limited War, Chicago: University of Chicago Press, 1957.
Schilling, Warner R. ,Paul Y. Hammond and Glenn H. Snyder, Strategy, Politics and Defense Budgets, New York: Columbia University Press, 1962.  
Taylor,  Maxwell D. The Uncertain Trumpet, New York: Harper & Row, 1960.
Watry, David M. Diplomacy at the Brink: Eisenhower, Churchill, and Eden in the Cold War'', Baton Rouge: Louisiana State University Press, 2014.

External links

Summary: John Foster Dulles, "The Evolution of Foreign Policy," Department of State Bulletin 30 (January 25, 1954): 107-10
Summary: John Lewis Gaddis, Strategies of Containment: A Critical Appraisal of Postwar American National Security (Oxford University Press, 1982)
Documents on Canadian External Relations: UNITED STATES DEFENCE POLICY: A "NEW LOOK," February 2, 1954

Cold War history of the United States
Cold War policies
Nuclear history of the United States
United States defense policymaking
Presidency of Dwight D. Eisenhower
Articles containing video clips
United States presidential domestic programs